This is a list of national parks in the Alps.

Swiss National Park (1914)

Gran Paradiso National Park (1922, coupled with the Vanoise)
Stelvio National Park (1935)
 Val Grande National Park (1992)
 Dolomiti Bellunesi National Park (1990)

Berchtesgaden National Park (1978)

Hohe Tauern National Park (Nationalpark Hohe Tauern) (1981)
 Limestone Alps National Park (Nationalpark Kalkalpen) (1997)
 Gesäuse National Park (2002)
 Nock Mountain National Park (Nationalpark Nockberge) (1987, only IUCN category V)

Triglav National Park (1924, in 1961 that zone became a national park)

Écrins National Park (1973)
Vanoise National Park (1963)
Mercantour National Park (1979)

 
Ecology of the Alps
Alps